Richard Hart (by 1517 – 6 May 1578), of Exeter, Devon, was an English politician.

Family
Hart had at least five sons.

Career
Hart was Member of Parliament for Exeter in March 1553, October 1553 and April 1554.

References

1578 deaths
Members of the Parliament of England (pre-1707) for Exeter
English MPs 1553 (Mary I)
English MPs 1553 (Edward VI)
English MPs 1554
Year of birth uncertain